is a 2009 turn-based strategy video game developed by Intelligent Systems and published by Square Enix for the Nintendo DSi via its DSiWare download service. It is part of the Dragon Quest series and supports up to three other players in multiplayer.

Gameplay

Dragon Quest Wars allows up to four players to battle one another with four monster units each on a four-sided battlefield made up a squares. Battles during the game are limited to five to ten turns. Players move units by touching and dragging them using the DS stylus. Commands are issued to units also by touching and dragging them onto a unit from the bottom of the screen. These commands are color-coded and include red (physical attacks), green (recovery), blue (defence), and yellow (magic). Each monster unit has between one and three hearts. These hearts deplete as monsters are attacked, and when they reach 0, the monster walks off the field. A player can win a battle either when all enemy units are defeated or if one of their units crosses into an enemy's base. Dragon Quest Wars also features "survival matches", which require the player to set all of their moves within a time limit before the battle begins. The game has six playable units: Slimes, Hammerhood, Dracky, Golem, Chimera, and Healslime. All are recurring monsters in the Dragon Quest series.

DevelopmentDragon Quest Wars was developed by Intelligent Systems as part of a collaboration between Nintendo and Square Enix for Intelligent Systems to design six video games for Square Enix on the DSiWare service. As with most other games in the Dragon Quest franchise, development on Dragon Wars was supervised by Yūji Horii, while Akira Toriyama and Koichi Sugiyama fulfilled their respective duties as character designer and composer. Producer Taichi Inuzuka states that has long been his hope to create simulation game (strategy game) with Dragon Quest. The developers wanted to design a game to "convey the fun of simulation games and to provide a gateway to users who’ve never played simulation games." Intelligent Systems previously developed the Wars and Fire Emblem series for Nintendo.

ReceptionDragon Quest Wars received "generally favorable" reviews, according to review aggregator Metacritic.1UP.com editor Justin Epperson described Dragon Quest Wars as a board game, going so far as to say he wishes it were a board game so it would be more entertaining. He added however that it was definitely worth the price. Wiiloveit.com offered a high recommendation with a 24/30, praising the "surprising amount of strategy", as well as the "robust" online mode which "[brought] the title to life". Dragon Quest Wars was nominated for Game of the Year by Nintendo Power'', as well as DSiWare Game of the Year.

References

External links
Official website 

2009 video games
DSiWare games
Intelligent Systems games
Nintendo DS-only games
Nintendo DS games
Role-playing video games
Turn-based tactics video games
Multiplayer and single-player video games
Video games developed in Japan
Video games scored by Koichi Sugiyama
Wars